Berlin-Lichtenberg is an electoral constituency (German: Wahlkreis) represented in the Bundestag. It elects one member via first-past-the-post voting. Under the current constituency numbering system, it is designated as constituency 86. It is located in eastern Berlin, comprising the Lichtenberg borough.

Berlin-Lichtenberg was created for the 2002 federal election. Since 2002, it has been represented by Gesine Lötzsch of The Left.

Geography 
Berlin-Lichtenberg is located in eastern Berlin. As of the 2021 federal election, it is coterminous with the Lichtenberg borough.

History 
Berlin-Lichtenberg was created in 2002 and contained parts of the abolished constituencies of Berlin Hohenschönhausen – Pankow – Weissensee and Friedrichshain – Lichtenberg. In the 2002 through 2009 elections, it was constituency 87 in the numbering system. Since the 2013 election, it has been number 86. Its borders have not changed since its creation.

Members 
The constituency has been represented by Gesine Lötzsch of The Left since its creation. Prior to the formation of The Left in 2005, she represented it as a member of the Party of Democratic Socialism (PDS).

Election results

2021 election

2017 election

2013 election

2009 election

References 

Federal electoral districts in Berlin
Lichtenberg
2002 establishments in Germany
Constituencies established in 2002